Otto Lous Mohr (8 March 1886 – 23 June 1967) was a Norwegian medical doctor.

Mohr was born in Mandal. He was a professor of anatomy at the University of Oslo from 1919 to 1952, and served as rector from 1946 to 1952.

During the German occupation of Norway he was arrested by the Nazi authorities on 11 September 1941, together with Didrik Arup Seip and Anton Wilhelm Brøgger. He was incarcerated at Møllergata 19 until 30 September, then at Grini concentration camp from 28 March 1942.

References

1886 births
1967 deaths
People from Mandal, Norway
Academic staff of the University of Oslo
Rectors of the University of Oslo
Grini concentration camp survivors